Anapsky District is an administrative district (raion), one of the thirty-eight in Krasnodar Krai, Russia. It is located in the west of the krai. Its administrative center is the town of Anapa (which is not a part of the administrative district). Population:

Administrative and municipal status
Within the framework of administrative divisions, Anapsky District is one of the thirty-eight in the krai. The town of Anapa serves as its administrative center, despite being incorporated separately as an administrative unit with the status equal to that of the districts.

As a municipal division, the territory of the administrative district and the territory of the Town of Anapa are incorporated together as Anapa Urban Okrug.

References

Notes

Sources

Districts of Krasnodar Krai
Anapa Urban Okrug
 
